The M5 motorway is a Hungarian motorway which connects Budapest with the south-eastern regions of the country, the cities of Kecskemét, Szeged, and finally Röszke on the Serbian border. The motorway reached the city of Szeged in December 2005, while the remaining portion (between Szeged and Röszke) was completed in April 2006.

The M5 continues as the A1 motorway in Serbia from the Serbian side of the border at Horgoš.  It is also the main route from Budapest to Bucharest via the M43 motorway and Romania's A1 motorway, as the link has been opened to traffic since July 2015.

Openings timeline
Budapest – Ócsa (30 km): 1985.11.22.
Ócsa – Örkény (23 km): 1985.11.22. - half profile; (this section was extended in 1986 and 1990)
Örkény – Kecskemét-north (30 km): 1989 - half profile; (this section was extended in 1996)
Kecskemét-north – Kecskemét-south (16 km): 1997.12.06.
Kecskemét-south – Kiskunfélegyháza (19 km): 1998.06.09.
Kiskunfélegyháza – Szeged; M43 (51 km): 2005.12.10.
Szeged; M43 – Röszke ( border) (14 km): 2006.03.11.

Junctions, exits and rest area

Distance from Zero Kilometre Stone (Adam Clark Square) in Budapest in kilometres.
 The route is full length motorway.

 Planned section

Maintenance
The operation and maintenance of the road by Intertoll. This activity is provided by these highway engineers.
 near Újhartyán, kilometre trench 43
 near Kiskunfélegyháza, kilometre trench 108
 near Balástya, kilometre trench 146

Payment
From February 1, 2015, the motorway can be used instead of the national sticker with the following county stickers:

Toll-free section
The collection and distribution circuits leading to Megapark-Tesco, Soroksár-Pestszentlőrinc-Nagybani market and Auchan shopping malls are free of charge (Bevásárlóközpontok junction).

European Route(s)

See also 

 Roads in Hungary
 Transport in Hungary
 International E-road network

External links 

National Toll Payment Services Plc. (in Hungarian, some information also in English)
 Hungarian Public Road Non-Profit Ltd. (Magyar Közút Nonprofit Zrt.)
 National Infrastructure Developer Ltd.

5